Carolann Héduit (born 2 December 2003) is a French artistic gymnast and a member of the French national gymnastics team. She is the 2018 European junior uneven bars bronze medalist and the 2021 French all-around champion. She represented France at the 2020 Summer Olympics.

Early life
Héduit was born in Angers, France on 2 December 2003. She started gymnastics at the age of six at Angers Gymnastique.

Career

Junior
Héduit was first added to the French national gymnastics team in 2016.

2017
Héduit made her international debut at the City of Jesolo Trophy, finishing fifth with the French junior team. Individually, she placed ninth in the all-around and fifth on the uneven bars. In May, she competed at the French Championships where she won the bronze medal in the all-around behind Célia Serber and Aline Friess. She also tied for the bronze medal with Juliette Bossu in the uneven bars final. Then at the FIT Challenge, she helped the French team win the silver medal behind Italy and finished fifth in the all-around. In July, she helped the French team win the silver medal at the German Junior Friendly, and she placed seventh in the all-around. Then in November, she competed at the Élite Gym Massilia in Marseille where she won the silver medal on the vault behind Aleksandra Shchekoldina of Russia. She also placed eighth in the all-around and sixth on the balance beam.

2018
In April, Héduit competed at the City of Jesolo Trophy where she won the bronze medal on the uneven bars behind Elisa Iorio of Italy and Ksenia Klimenko of Russia. She also placed third with the French team and eleventh in the all-around. Then at the French Championships, she placed second in the all-around behind Célia Serber and fourth on the uneven bars. She won the silver medal in the all-around behind Anastasiia Bachynska of Ukraine at the Youth Olympic Qualifier. Then at the Pieve di Soligo Friendly, she helped the French team win the silver medal behind Italy and won the bronze medal in the all-around behind Italians Elisa Iorio and Giorgia Villa. She was then selected to represent France at the European Championships in Glasgow and helped the French team finish fifth. She qualified for the uneven bars final where she won the bronze medal behind Russians Ksenia Klimenko and Irina Komnova. She qualified for the Youth Olympic Games in Buenos Aires, but she was injured before the start of the competition. She returned to competition in November at the Élite Gym Massilia where she won the gold medal on the uneven bars and the silver medal in the all-around.

Senior

2019
Héduit became age-eligible for senior competition in 2019. In March, she competed at the Birmingham World Cup and finished fourth behind Aliya Mustafina of Russia, Riley McCusker of the United States, and Thaís Fidélis of Brazil. In June, she placed sixth at the French Championships and was selected to compete at the European Games in Minsk. She finished seventeenth all-around in qualifications, but did not make the final due to the two-per-country rule. She missed the second half of the 2019 season due to an ankle injury and had surgery in August.

2020-21
Héduit did not compete in any international competitions in 2020 due to the impacts of the COVID-19 pandemic. In December 2020, she competed at the Coupe d’Hiver and finished seventh in the all-around and won a silver medal in the team event.

In April, Héduit was selected to represent France at the 2021 European Championships alongside Mélanie de Jesus dos Santos, Marine Boyer and Sheyen Petit. She qualified for the all-around final where she placed twelfth. She was the second reserve for the floor final, but ended up competing after Larisa Iordache of Romania withdrew from the final due to health issues and Giulia Steingruber of Switzerland withdrew due to injury. However, Héduit sustained a knee injury during the final and could not finish her routine. The injury was not serious, and she returned to training a few days later.

In June, Héduit became the French all-around champion, and she also won the titles on balance beam and floor exercise, and she placed fourth on the uneven bars. Later that month, she was selected to represent France at the 2020 Summer Olympics alongside Marine Boyer, Mélanie de Jesus dos Santos and Aline Friess. At the Olympics, Héduit helped France qualify to the team final where they finished sixth. She also qualified for the all-around final with a total score of 53.565.

In September, Héduit was selected to compete at the 2021 World Championships alongside Coline Devillard and Célia Serber. She qualified for the all-around final and finished ninth with a total score of 51.965.

2022

In April, Héduit finished fourth on the balance beam at the Baku World Cup.

In June Héduit competed at the Mediterranean Games, where the French team took the silver medal behind Italy. Individually, Héduit won the bronze medals in the all-around and on the balance beam, and finished sixth on the uneven bars. At the European Championships in Munich, France finished sixth in the team final. Additionally, Héduit placed fourth in the all-around, and won the bronze medal on the balance beam behind Emma Malewski and Ondine Achampong.

In October Héduit was named to the team to compete at the World Championships in Liverpool alongside Marine Boyer, Mélanie de Jesus dos Santos, Coline Devillard, and Aline Friess.

Competitive history

References

External links 
 

2003 births
Living people
French female artistic gymnasts
Sportspeople from Angers
Gymnasts at the 2019 European Games
European Games competitors for France
Gymnasts at the 2020 Summer Olympics
Olympic gymnasts of France
Mediterranean Games silver medalists for France
Mediterranean Games bronze medalists for France
Mediterranean Games medalists in gymnastics
Gymnasts at the 2022 Mediterranean Games
21st-century French women